Frank Dedecker (born 9 August 1950) is a Belgian rower. He competed in the men's coxless four event at the 1976 Summer Olympics.

References

1950 births
Living people
Belgian male rowers
Olympic rowers of Belgium
Rowers at the 1976 Summer Olympics
People from Wilrijk